Babblarna (The Babblers) are Swedish fictional characters used as children's language tools, created by illustrator and writer Annelie Tisell. The characters are inspired by professor Irene Johansson and the Karlstadmodel to train people with vocal, language and communication problems. The characters Babba, Bibbi, Bobbo, Dadda, Diddi and Doddo were created in the early 1980s. Babblarna's Youtube channel has over 600 million views. It won a Kristallen award in 2018.

Babblarna also has channels for English, German, Norwegian and Finnish. On the Sverigetopplistan record charts, their children's music album Upp och ner och hit och dit med Babblarna! has peaked at number 27 on the albums chart, and has been certified Platinum. Meanwhile, their song "Babblarnas vaggvisa" has peaked at number 22 on the singles chart.

References

Fictional Swedish people
Kristallen winners